Stephen Bartolin Jr., or Steve Bartolin is a former professional baseball player for the Detroit Tigers and former CEO of The Broadmoor hotel in Colorado Springs, Colorado.

Career 
Bartolin is a graduate of Youngstown State University in Youngstown, Ohio, with a Bachelor of Science degree in business. He joined The Greenbrier in 1975.

In 1980, Steve Bartolin left The Greenbrier to become director of convention services at Opryland Hotel in Nashville, Tennessee, a position he held for five years.  In 1985, he was promoted to resident manager at Opryland Hotel which, at the time, was an 1,100-room facility with 225,000 square feet of meeting and convention space.

In September 1987, Steve Bartolin returned to The Greenbrier as general manager of the 6,500 acre, 650-room destination resort.

In 1991, he was named president and CEO of The Broadmoor in Colorado Springs, Colorado, a position he held for 24 years, becoming the longest-serving president in The Broadmoor's history.

In March 2015, he was named chairman of The Broadmoor and its related businesses.

Recognition 
1997 –  Resort Executive of the Year 

2005 –  Colorado Hotelier of the Year

2013 –  CEO of the Year by Colorado Business Magazine

Other information 
Youngstown State University Athletic Hall of Fame 

Drafted by the Detroit Tigers in 1972 and played professional baseball until 1975

References 

American chief executives of travel and tourism industry companies
Year of birth missing (living people)
Living people
Youngstown State University alumni
Minor league baseball players
The Greenbrier people